This is a list of the tallest buildings in Myanmar. The list includes habitable buildings standing at or above 90 meters (295 feet) but excludes other structures above 90 meters such as the Yeywa Dam, the Laykyun Sekkya Buddha Statue, the Shwemawdaw Pagoda, etc. For other tallest structures, see List of tallest structures in Myanmar.

All of Myanmar's tallest buildings are high rises. The country does not have a skyscraper—i.e. one at least 150 meters tall as defined by the Council on Tall Buildings and Urban Habitat and Emporis. Most of the tallest buildings are located in Yangon where zoning regulations restrict the maximum height of buildings to 127 meters (417 feet) above sea level, in order to prevent buildings from overtaking the Shwedagon Pagoda. The first ever attempt to build a skyscraper in the country—a 195-meter (640-foot) tower in downtown Yangon— faced intense opposition by local conservationists, and was cancelled in 2014.

Tallest buildings
The following list ranks completed buildings in Myanmar that stand about 90 meters (295 feet) or taller based on the estimates by Emporis, unless otherwise stated. Because of the Emporis estimates, the list may not be fully accurate—in terms of inclusion and rankings. (Emporis estimates the height of buildings based on the number of floors; as a result, buildings with the same number of floors—regardless of the type (office or residential)—are estimated at the same height.) Height estimates are denoted in italics.

The list may not be up-to-date.

Tallest under construction
The list below covers the buildings under construction that will be 90 meters or taller. Height estimates are denoted in italics, and are sourced from Emporis unless otherwise stated. Given the dynamic nature of the topic, the list may not be up to date, and is likely incomplete.

Tallest proposed

Timeline of tallest buildings

The timeline below may be incomplete. Height estimates are denoted in italics.

See also
 List of tallest structures in Myanmar
 List of tallest buildings in Yangon

External sources
 Committee for Quality Control of High Rise Building Construction Projects, Republic of the Union of Myanmar

Notes

References

Bibliography
 

Lists of buildings and structures in Myanmar
Architecture in Myanmar
Myanmar
Myanmar